Diuris brevifolia, commonly known as the short-leaved donkey orchid, is a species of orchid which is endemic to South Australia.  It has a few narrow, twisted leaves and a flowering stem with up to five bright yellow flowers with brown markings and relatively large, spreading lobes on the labellum. This is a relatively late-flowering species of donkey orchid.

Description
There are two brown spots on the base of the dorsal sepal and the labellum callus is outlined in brown. Flowering occurs from October to December.

Taxonomy and naming
Diuris brevifolia was first formally described in 1922 by Richard Sanders Rogers who published his description in Transactions and Proceedings of the Royal Society of South Australia. The specific epithet (brevifolia) is derived from the Latin words brevis meaning "short" and folia meaning "leaves".

Distribution and habitat
The short-leaved donkey orchid grows in a variety of habitats including heath, forest and woodland but is most common around the edges of swamps and river flats. It only occurs to the south of Adelaide and on Kangaroo Island.

Conservation
There has been a large decline in the distribution and abundance of this donkey orchid in recent years and is listed as "endangered" in South Australia. The main threats to the species are incompatible land use and infrequent fire.

References

brevifolia
Orchids of South Australia
Endemic orchids of Australia
Plants described in 1922